Arirang TV (Arirang International Broadcasting) is a South Korean-based broadcasting company operated by the International Broadcasting Exchange Foundation. It provides English information on current events, culture, and history of Korea to the surrounding areas of Korea. Arirang TV (Arirang International Broadcasting) is name after the Korean traditional folk song “Arirang.”

It began as a cable TV service in South Korea on February 3, 1997, and opened Korea's first overseas satellite broadcasting in 1999 in the Asia-Pacific region. It launched worldwide broadcasting in Europe, Africa, and the Americas in 2000.

Three channels are broadcast 24 hours a day with the main language English. In addition, they provide subtitles for Chinese, Spanish, Korean, Arabic, Russian, Vietnamese and Indonesian (multilingual subtitle services). In May 2022, Arirang Espanol, a Spanish-language YouTube channel, was launched.

Arirang International Broadcasting operates on three channels (World, UN, and South Korea), and uses a total of eight major broadcasting satellite relays. It has 36 programs covering the international economy, current situation, culture, and entertainment, and it consists of programs for domestic and foreign opinion leaders as well as programs for viewers of various ages.

Arirang Radio is the first English radio broadcast in Korea.

Currently, it is communicating with more viewers through various programs which has about 144 million households in 108 countries around the world.

Undertaking

Overseas satellite broadcasting projects to enhance the national image and the understanding of the international community

Domestic broadcasting business to promote foreigners' understanding of Korea and raise Koreans' awareness of globalization

Support project to enhance the international competitiveness of broadcasting videos

Broadcasting Supporting Project of Korean Broadcasting System via Foreign Media

International Exchange & Cooperation Business with Overseas Broadcasting Companies

Advertising projects; such as overseas advertising agency projects for government and public institutions

Slogan

Korea World Network (1997. 2. 3 ~ 2005)

Korea's Global TV (2005 ~ 2012)

Korea for the World, The World for Korea (2005 ~ 2008)

Korea's Multilingual TV (2007 ~ 2008)

Asia's Heartbeat (2012 ~ 29/6/2015)

The World On arirang (30/6/2015 ~ 2022)

RESONATING WITH THE WORLD( From 2023 )

Channel

Korea (Domestic Broadcasting): Launched February 3, 1997. It is broadcasting through cable, satellite, and IPTV throughout Korea.

World (overseas): World (launched August 12, 1999) The main broadcasting language is English, but also provides multilingual subtitles.

UN In-house Network (overseas): Launched July 14, 2015. It is available at the UN headquarters in New York and broadcasts current news reports and liberal arts programs.

Goal

World Channel: Real-time Korean Information Channel (providing Korean information + promoting own culture + promoting modern culture + international amity exchange)

Korea Channel: Multicultural channel (providing Korean information + promoting native culture + promoting modern culture + understanding multiculturalism)

Distribution

Arirang International Broadcasting operates on three channels (World, UN and Korea), and uses a total of eight satellite relays to serve as a messenger to inform 144 million households in 108 countries of Korea's past, present, and future.

In Korea, it can be watched on cable TV, satellite broadcasting, and IPTV.

Program

Arirang TV broadcasts various genres of programs covering the international economy, situation, culture, and entertainment, and through this, it consists of programs for domestic and foreign opinion leaders as well as programs that viewers of various ages can enjoy.

•NEWS
09:00	New Day at arirang

09:30	NEWs Generation 

12:00	News at Noon

14:00	The Daily Report

14:30	Issues & Insiders 

18:00	Newscenter

18:30	Within the Frame 

21:00	Arirang Nightline

12:00	Weekly News Highlights (SATURDAY)

•TV

온라인(유튜브)

•Arirang TV

•Arirang News

•Arirang K-POP

•@KPOP

•Arirang Culture

•Arirang Issue (Current Affairs)

•Arirang Food & Travel

References

External links 
 

Companies based in Seoul
Television channels and stations established in 1997
Television networks in South Korea
24-hour television news channels in South Korea
Korean-language television stations
Mass media in Seoul
English-language television stations